The Hungary women's national water polo team represents Hungary in international women's water polo competitions and friendly matches. The team is one of the leading teams in Europe since the early 1990s, claiming the world title at the 1994 World Aquatics Championships in Rome, Italy and at the  2005 World Aquatics Championships in Montreal, Canada.

Results

Olympic Games

World Championship

World Cup

World League

European Championship

LEN Europa Cup

Team

Current squad
Roster for the 2020 Summer Olympics.

Former squads

Olympic Games

 2012 – 4th place
Flóra Bolonyai (GK), Dóra Czigány, Dóra Antal, Hanna Kisteleki, Gabriella Szűcs, Orsolya Takács, Rita Drávucz (C), Rita Keszthelyi, Ildikó Tóth, Barbara Bujka, Dóra Csabai, Katalin Menczinger and Edina Gangl (GK). Head coach: András Merész.

 2016 – 4th place
Edina Gangl (GK), Dóra Czigány, Dóra Antal, Hanna Kisteleki, Gabriella Szűcs, Orsolya Takács, Anna Illés, Rita Keszthelyi (C), Ildikó Tóth, Barbara Bujka, Dóra Csabai, Krisztina Garda and Orsolya Kasó (GK). Head coach: Attila Bíró.

World Championships

 1994 –   Gold Medal
Katalin Dancsa, Andrea Eke, Zsuzsanna Huff, Zsuzsa Kertész, Ildikó Kuna, Irén Rafael, Katalin Rédei, Edit Sipos, Mercédesz Stieber, Orsolya Szalkay, Krisztina Szremkó, Gabriella Tóth and Noémi Tóth. Head coach: Gyula Tóth.

 2001 –  Silver Medal
Katalin Dancsa, Rita Drávucz, Anikó Pelle, Ágnes Primász, Katalin Rédei, Edit Sipos, Ildikó Sós, Mercédesz Stieber, Brigitta Szép, Krisztina Szremkó, Zsuzsanna Tiba, Ágnes Valkai and Erzsébet Valkai. Head coach: Tamás Faragó.

 2005 –   Gold Medal
Patrícia Horváth, Eszter Tomaskovics, Khrisctina Serfozo, Dóra Kisteleki, Mercédesz Stieber, Andrea Tóth, Rita Drávucz, Krisztina Zantleitner, Orsolya Takács, Anikó Pelle, Ágnes Valkai, Fruzsina Brávik and Timea Benko. Head coach: Tamás Faragó.

 2013 –  Bronze Medal
Flóra Bolonyai, Anna Illés, Dóra Antal, Dóra Kisteleki, Gabriella Szűcs, Orsolya Takács, Ibolya Kitti Miskolczi, Rita Keszthelyi (C), Ildikó Tóth, Barbara Bujka, Krisztina Garda, Katalin Menczinger and Orsolya Kasó. Head coach: András Merész.

 2022 –  Silver Medal
Kamilla Faragó, Edina Gangl, Krisztina Garda, Gréta Gurisatti, Rita Keszthelyi, Dóra Leimeter, Alda Magyari, Geraldine Mahieu, Zsuzsanna Máté, Rebecca Parkes, Natasa Rybanska, Dorottya Szilágyi, Vanda Vályi. Head coach: Attila Biró.

European Championships

 1993 –  Bronze Medal
Katalin Dancsa, Andrea Eke, Alíz Kertész, Mária Konrád, Katalin Nagy, Irén Rafael, Ildikó Rónaszéki, Mercédesz Stieber, Orsolya Szalkai, Brigitta Szép, Ildikó Takács, Gabriella Tóth, Noémi Tóth, and Edit Vincze. Head Coach: Gyula Tóth.

 1995 –  Silver Medal
Krisztina Kardos, Gabriella Tóth, Edit Sipos, Andrea Eke, Mercédesz Stieber, Edit Vincze, Katalin Rédei, Irén Rafael, Krisztina Szremkó, Ágnes Primász, Anikó Pelle, Krisztina Zantleitner, Noémi Tóth, Brigitta Szép, and Márta Pápai. Head Coach: Gyula Tóth.

 2001 –  Gold Medal
Katalin Dancsa, Rita Drávucz, Anett Györe, Anikó Pelle, Ágnes Primász, Katalin Rédei, Edit Sipos, Ildikó Sós, Mercédesz Stieber, Brigitta Szép, Krisztina Szremkó, Zsuzsanna Tiba, Andrea Tóth, Ágnes Valkai, and Erzsébet Valkai. Head Coach: Tamás Faragó.

 2003 –  Silver Medal
Rita Drávucz, Ildikó Sós, Andrea Tóth, Krisztina Szremkó, Ágnes Valkai, Anikó Pelle, Ágnes Primász, Mercédesz Stieber, Anett Györe, Erzsébet Valkai, Zsuzsanna Tiba, Dóra Kisteleki, Tímea Benkõ, Edit Sipos, and Krisztina Zantleitner. Head Coach: Tamás Faragó.

 2012 –  Bronze Medal
Flóra Bolonyai, Dóra Csabai, Dóra Antal, Hanna Kisteleki, Gabriella Szűcs, Orsolya Takács, Rita Drávucz (C), Rita Keszthelyi, Ildikó Tóth, Barbara Bujka, Anna Illés, Katalin Menczinger and Edina Gangl. Head Coach: András Merész.

 2014 –  Bronze Medal
Flóra Bolonyai, Dóra Csabai, Dóra Antal, Dóra Kisteleki, Gabriella Szűcs, Orsolya Takács, Hanna Kisteleki, Rita Keszthelyi (C), Ildikó Tóth, Barbara Bujka, Dóra Csabai, Anna Illés and Edina Gangl. Head Coach: András Merész.

 2016 –  Gold Medal
Edina Gangl, Dóra Czigány, Dóra Antal, Hanna Kisteleki, Gabriella Szűcs, Orsolya Takács, Anna Illés, Rita Keszthelyi (C), Barbara Bujka, Dóra Csabai, Krisztina Garda, Orsolya Kasó. Head coach: Attila Bíró.

 2020 –  Bronze Medal
Edina Gangl, Dorottya Szilágyi, Zsuzsanna Máté, Gréta Gurisatti, Vanda Vályi, Rebecca Parkes, Anna Illés, Rita Keszthelyi (C), Dóra Leimeter, Anikó Gyöngyössy, Natasa Rybanska, Krisztina Garda and Orsolya Kasó.  Head coach: Attila Bíró.

Other Tournaments

 2002 FINA World Cup –  Gold Medal
Tímea Benkô, Rita Drávucz, Anett Györe, Patrícia Horváth, Anikó Pelle, Ágnes Primász, Ildikó Sós, Mercédesz Stieber, Krisztina Szremkó, Zsuzsanna Tiba, Ágnes Valkai, Erzsébet Valkai, and Krisztina Zantleitner. Head Coach: Tamás Faragó.

 2020 FINA World League –  Silver Medal
Alda Magyari, Dorottya Szilágyi, Dóra Antal, Gréta Gurisatti, Gabriella Szűcs, Rebecca Parkes, Anna Illés, Rita Keszthelyi (C), Dóra Leimeter, Anikó Gyöngyössy, Vanda Vályi, Natasa Rybanska, Krisztina Garda, Zsuzsanna Máté and Orsolya Kasó Head coach: Attila Bíró.

Under-20 team
Hungary lastly competed at the 2021 FINA Junior Water Polo World Championships where they won the bronze medal.

See also
 Hungary women's Olympic water polo team records and statistics
 Hungary men's national water polo team
 List of world champions in women's water polo

References

External links

FINA
Squads

Women's national water polo teams
Women's water polo in Hungary